Rao Joginder Singh whose name was recorded incorrectly as Joginder Singh Rao  throughout his career (16 October 1938 – 3 October 1994) was an Indian cricketer: a right-arm medium pace bowler who played only five first-class games, all for Services in the 1963–64 Ranji Trophy, but who is notable for having not only taken a hat-trick on debut, but for following that up with two more in the same innings of his second match, one of only two men to have achieved this latter feat (the other being Albert Trott) and the only man to have taken three in his first two games.

Born in Gurgaon, Punjab, Rao became only the seventh man to achieve the hat-trick on debut when he dismissed three Jammu and Kashmir batsmen as they were bowled out for just 47. Less than a week later, he went one better against Northern Punjab, when he claimed two hat-tricks in the second innings. His six victims were: Suresh Sharma, Ashok Khanna, Bhupinder Singh; and Rajinder Kale, Ramnath Paul, Bishen Singh Bedi.

Rao played only three more times, as shortly afterwards he was injured in a parachuting accident while serving as a captain in the army. He took up golf and represented India in France and Pakistan. He redesigned the Army golf course in the Delhi Cantonment and the Dehra Dun golf course. He served in the India-Pakistan wars in 1965 and 1971, and reached the rank of Major-General in the Indian Army.

Personal life
He married Nandita Rao and had two sons with her. Probir Rao and Rahul Rao.

He died in India on 3 October 1994, thirteen days short of his 56th birthday.

World Record
Joginder Singh Rao equalled Charlie Parker's world record of three hat-tricks in a single first-class season. He achieved this in 1963–64, around 40 years after Parker. His record was later equalled by Dean Headley who achieved this feat in 1996.

References

External links
 

1938 births
1994 deaths
Indian cricketers
People from Gurgaon
Services cricketers
Indian Army officers
Golf course architects
Northern Punjab cricketers